Belenois ogygia is a butterfly in the family Pieridae. It is found in South Africa and the Democratic Republic of the Congo.

Taxonomy
The species is probably a hybrid of Belenois thysa and Belenois zochalia.

Subspecies
Belenois ogygia ogygia (South Africa)
Belenois ogygia bongeya Berger, 1981 (Democratic Republic of the Congo)

References

Butterflies described in 1883
Pierini
Butterflies of Africa
Taxa named by Roland Trimen